Xironomi is a village in Boeotia, Greece. It belongs to the Thisvi municipal unit.

Name
The origins of the name Xironomi still remain unknown.

See also
List of settlements in Boeotia

References

External links
Thisvi: History and Photos
Thisvi Municipality

Populated places in Boeotia